Jadwiga Dobrzyńska (1898 – 1 February 1940) was a Polish architect. Her work was part of the architecture event in the art competition at the 1928 Summer Olympics. She was one of the first female graduates of the Warsaw University of Technology's Faculty of Architecture in 1922.

References

1898 births
1940 deaths
20th-century Polish architects
Polish women architects
Olympic competitors in art competitions
Architects from Warsaw
20th-century Polish women